Stargardt is a surname. It is likely a Germanized form of a West Slavic toponym such as Stargard, meaning "old town/city". Notable people with the surname include:

 Joseph Abraham Stargardt (1822–1885), German bookseller
 Karl Stargardt (1875–1927), German ophthalmologist
 Nicholas Stargardt (born 1962), Australian historian

See also
 
 Stargardt disease
 Stargard

Surnames of Slavic origin